is a third-sector railway company which operates Hisatsu Orange Railway Line in Kumamoto and Kagoshima prefectures. The line follows the former part of the JR Kyushu Kagoshima Main Line that connected Yatsushiro and Sendai in Kumamoto and Kagoshima Prefectures, known historically as Higo and Satsuma Provinces. The length of the line is 116.9 km.

Hisatsu Orange Railway went into service on March 13, 2004, when ownership was transferred from JR and the high speed Kyushu Shinkansen service began. The Hisatsu Orange Railway runs close to the Yatsushiro Sea and East China Sea and connects to the Kagoshima Main Line on both ends. The route is indirect and winding, but connects several cities along the coast.

The company has a total of 19 diesel cars, but two of them are reserved for special events.

Shareholders in the railway include prefectures of Kumamoto and Kagoshima, cities of Yatsushiro, Minamata, Izumi, Akune and Satsumasendai, towns of Tsunagi and Ashikita, and the Japan Freight Railway Company.

History
The Sendai - Yatsushiro section was built by the (then) Japanese Imperial Railway and opened between 1922–27, at which time this route replaced the Hisatsu Line to become the southern part of the Kagoshima Main Line.

The Yunoura - Tsunagi section was duplicated between 1966 and 1968. CTC signalling was commissioned from Yatsushiro - Sendai in 1969/70, and the line was electrified in 1970.

In 2004, following the opening of the Kagoshima - Shin Yatsushiro section of the Kyushu Shinkansen, operation of the section was transferred under the Third Sector arrangements.

Former connecting lines
Minamata Station: The first section of the Yamano line was opened from Kurino (on the Hisatsu Line) 24 km to Yamano in 1921. The 14 km Minamata - Kugino section opened in 1934, and the 10 km Yamato - Satsuma section the following year. In 1937 the 8 km Kugino - Satsuma section, including the Okawa spiral opened. Freight services ceased in 1986, and the line closed in 1988.

Hisatsu Orange Railway Line
JR Freight operates Hisatsu Orange Railway Line as a Category-2 operator.

Overview
Length: 116.9 km
Gauge: 
Number of Stations: 28
Track
Double: between Yunoura and Tsunagi
Single: the rest of the line
Electrification: 20 kV AC, 60 Hz

Stations
● = Trains stop
| = Trains pass
The stations are going to be stopped by all trains from 13 March 2021.

Free ticket 
Selling Orange 18 Free Kippu at 2100 yen is timed coincide to release Seishun 18 Kippu. It releases for passengers who have vail ticket (Seishun 18 Kippu).

See also
 List of railway lines in Japan

References

Route diagram:  p. 15-17, Vol. 14, October 25, 2006 - JTB Publishing Inc.

External links
  

Railway companies of Japan
Rail transport in Kagoshima Prefecture
Rail transport in Kumamoto Prefecture
1067 mm gauge railways in Japan
Railway companies established in 2004
Japanese third-sector railway lines